Blata may refer to:

Blata (company), a Czech bicycle company
Blatta or Blata, an Ethiopian title
 Blata, Croatia, a village near Saborsko